Marlon Shirley (born April 21, 1978) is a paralympic athlete from the United States competing mainly in category T44 events.

Biography
Marlon's early life was spent in foster care around Las Vegas, and his left foot was amputated at the age of five after a lawnmower accident in an orphanage in Boulder City, Nevada. His life was turned around at the age of nine when he was adopted by a family in Tremonton, Utah.

Marlon Shirley competed in the 2000 Summer Paralympics long jump, as well as a silver in the high jump and a gold in the 100m.  He then defended his 100m title in 2004 Summer Paralympics where he also won a silver in the 200m and a bronze in long jump.  He competed in just the 100m at the 2008 Summer Paralympics but could not defend his title, due to a ruptured achilles.

See also
 The Mechanics of Running Blades

References

External links 
 
 

1978 births
Living people
American male sprinters
American male high jumpers
American male long jumpers
Paralympic track and field athletes of the United States
Paralympic gold medalists for the United States
Paralympic silver medalists for the United States
Paralympic bronze medalists for the United States
Athletes (track and field) at the 2000 Summer Paralympics
Athletes (track and field) at the 2004 Summer Paralympics
Athletes (track and field) at the 2008 Summer Paralympics
Medalists at the 2000 Summer Paralympics
Medalists at the 2004 Summer Paralympics
People from Tremonton, Utah
Paralympic medalists in athletics (track and field)
Medalists at the 2007 Parapan American Games
Sprinters with limb difference
High jumpers with limb difference
Long jumpers with limb difference
Paralympic sprinters
Paralympic high jumpers
Paralympic long jumpers